S.P. Hosimin  (born 14 April 1976) is a highly experienced film director and screenwriter with a strong background in both the creative and technical aspects of the film industry. He has worked as both an associate director and co-director with esteemed Director Shankar and has also directed and produced television commercials for his own production company, Redfox Productions. He made his directorial debut with the romantic drama February 14 in 2005 and later released Aayiram Vilakku in 2011. He is now working on his upcoming release, Sumo, an action-comedy film produced by Dr. Ishari Ganesh of Vels Film International, set to release in 2023 and featuring Rajiv Menon as the Cinematographer. He is also producing the movie "Rainbow" starring Bigboss fame Niroop under his Hosimin Productions with Sri Annamar Productions.

Early life 
Hosimin, born in Cumbum in Tamil Nadu, comes from a family of educators. His father, S. Pitchaimani, is a government teacher and drawing master, S.P. Hosimin comes from a family of artistic talent, with his father S. Pitchaimani being a renowned artist and drawing master. His father is also a government teacher and well known for his father's nickname, Ellora Arts. His father's  talents extend beyond the classroom as he has held the position of President of Tamil Nadu Murporkku Ezhuthalar Sangam in Bodinayakanur.while his mother, S.P. Rajalakshmi, is a housewife. The family moved from Cumbum to Bodinayakanur where Hosimin grew up. He completed his education at various institutions in the area, including:

 Up to 10th grade, ZKM Higher Secondary School, Bodinayakanur.
 11th and 12th grade, MGR Higher Secondary School, Chennai
 B.Sc. Mathematics, A.M. Jain College (1991–1993)
 M.A. Mass Communication, Madurai Kamaraj University, Madurai (1994–1995)

He also has siblings, including his brothers S.P. Jothibasu, S.P. Alendey Kannan, and S.P. Mythili. Hosimin has been a writer from his early age, he wrote short stories, poems in top magazines and got rewards and awards. He is now a highly experienced film director with a strong background in both creative and technical aspects of the film industry.

Film career 

S.P. Hosimin is a renowned film director known for his expertise in both creative and technical aspects of the film industry. He started his career as a journalist and was selected as a Sub-Editor for the highly acclaimed Tamil weekly magazine Ananda Vikatan. With a passion for writing, he interviewed many celebrities including Pakistan's Supreme Court Judge and former Prime Minister, and quickly became known for his writing style and popularity among readers.

It was during his tenure as a journalist that he interviewed the renowned director Shankar and was immediately impressed by his writing and creative skills. Shankar saw potential in Hosimin and offered him the opportunity to work on his third film, Indian, starring Kamal Haasan and Manisha Koirala. Hosimin took care of costumes and researched the Indian Freedom period for the movie, and his contribution was highly appreciated.

Hosimin continued to work with Shankar for 8 years on films such as Indian, Jeans, Mudhalvan, Nayak and Enthiran, and remains an integral part of his team to this day. In addition to his work on Indian, Hosimin was also involved in the graphics part of the film Jeans with pentamedia visual effect company, and his work was highly praised. He also played prominent roles in Shankar's Mudhalvan film as co-director, and had a major role in Enthiran discussions.

In 2005, Hosimin made his directorial debut with the romantic drama film February 14, produced by Salem A Chandrasekar's Sri Saravana creations (Producer of Ghajini).  starring Bharath , Renuka Menon, Vadivelu, and Santhanam.. His second project, Aayiram Vilakku, was released in 2011. The film, produced by HMI Movies, and the music score was composed by Srikanth Deva, revolves around the bonding of a young guy and an old man portrayed by Shanthnoo and Sathyaraj respectively.

Currently, Hosimin is working on his upcoming release, Sumo, an action-comedy film produced by Dr. Ishari Ganesh of Vels Film International, set to be released in 2023, and featuring Rajiv Menon as the Cinematographer. featuring an impressive cast including Yoshinori Tashiro, Mirchi Shiva, Priya Anand, Yogi Babu, and VTV Ganesh.

He is also producing a movie titled Rainbow, starring Niroop of Big Boss fame, under his own production company Hosimin Productions in collaboration with Sri Annamar Productions.

Hosimin has also directed several commercials for brands including TVS Bike and TLC Insurance. With a career spanning decades, Hosimin has cemented his place as one of the most talented and respected figures in the film industry.

Personal life 

S.P. Hosimin, tied the knot with the beautiful Hema, hailing from Srivilliputhur. The daughter of Subbiah and Muniamma, Hema was brought into Hosimin's life through an arranged marriage orchestrated by their families. The couple's nuptials took place on a picturesque August 18 in 2011, at the Valli Thirumana Mandapam located within the Vadapalani Murugan Temple. Together, the couple is blessed with a son, Jai Siddharth, who was born on May 12, 2012..

Filmography

As director, writer

As director, writer and producer

As an actor

References 

Bigg Boss fame Niroop turns hero with Rainbow produced bu S.P.Hosimin
 A Japanese sumo-wrestling champion walks into a Tamil film directed by S.P.Hosimin

External links 
 Director Hosimin Instagram Profile
 Hosimin Linkedin Profile
 

1975 births
Living people
Indian film directors
Tamil film directors
Tamil-language film directors
People from Tamil Nadu